The Handan–Jinan railway or Hanji railway is a railway between Handan in Hebei and Jinan in Shandong Province in northern China.

When the Hanji Line began operation in 2000, it had a designed annual transport capacity of 20 million tons of goods a year.  The line completed 21.56 million tons in 2001 and since 2003 has exceeded 30 million tons transported each year.  The line is operated by Hanji Railway Company Limited, a state-owned joint-stock company based in Liaocheng with the Ministry of Railways, Shandong Province and Hebei Province as shareholders.  In 2003, the line generated Y600 million profit.  In 2008, planning began for a second track and electrification of the line, which would increase annual carrying capacity to 80-100 million tons.

On 10 December 2014 the section between Handan and Liaocheng began being used for long-distance passenger trains. This was the first time passenger services had operated on the line.

Rail connections
Handan: Beijing–Guangzhou railway, Handan–Changzhi railway
Liaocheng: Beijing–Kowloon railway
Jinan: Beijing–Shanghai railway

References

Railway lines in China
Rail transport in Hebei
Rail transport in Shandong
Railway lines opened in 2000